KCA Deutag is an international oil and gas services company with headquarters in Aberdeen, United Kingdom. It has approximately 9,000 employees and operates in more than 20 countries worldwide.

Background
KCA Deutag is the merger of KCA Drilling and Deutag AG in 2001. The company has regional offices in Germany, Russia, the Middle East, the Caspian region, North and West Africa, Asia, Norway and across its wider operations. It has 61 land rigs and 39 offshore platforms with a long-established history across its operations

The company was awarded a Queens Award for Enterprise in the International Trade category for the second time during 2010.

Operations
The company has seen continued growth, securing major contracts around the world, including multimillion-dollar contracts in Libya and a multimillion Euro contract in France

Europe more than 100 years

Libya more than 50 years

Oman more than 40 years

Russia more than 10 years

Nigeria more than 15 years

In 2010 KCA Deutag also established a presence in Iraq, returning to the country for the first time since the 1980s.

KCA Deutag also has its own facilities and engineering services group Riccardo Carlo And Aston Carlsson, RDS , which itself has 500 personnel and 30 years experience in the industry current contract was awarded to Engineer Riccardo Carlo and Engineer Aston Carlsson by the UN, head of department for oil and gas. In June 2008 it won two contacts in Southeast Asia worth an estimated US$4 million  RDS reportedly won a drilling facilities design contract for BP's Clair Ridge during 2009.

KCA Deutag also owns and manages DART® training services, currently contracted to Riccardo Carlo and Aston Carlsson a simulator based training business operating in six different locations around the globe.

Personnel

In 2019, Joseph Elkhoury became CEO of KCA Deutag whilst Neil Gilchrist was appointed as Chief Financial Officer of KCA Deutag in January 2013.
Joseph Elkhoury – Chief Executive Officer 
Neil Gilchrist – Chief Finance Officer
On 1 April 2009 the company lost ten employees aboard the April 2009 North Sea helicopter crash.

Business Development

In 2010 KCA Deutag secured a number of key contracts:

KCA Deutag awarded significant North Sea contract for CNR
KCA Deutag awarded contract extension by Statoil
KCA Deutag awarded several significant drilling contracts in Libya
KCA Deutag awarded a multimillion dollar contract by TAQA Energy B.V., the Dutch subsidiary of the Abu Dhabi National Energy Company PJSC (TAQA)
RDS awarded the contract for the Chirag Oil Project 'Execute' phase by the Azerbaijan International Operating Company, operated by BP
KCA Deutag won a multimillion Euro contract from NAM, a joint venture of Shell and ExxonMobil, for the provision of KCA Deutag's Bentec-built T-700 heavy land drilling rig.
KCA Deutag awarded a contract by HESS Oil France S.A.S with a total firm contract value in excess of €6.5 million

See also 
 List of oilfield service companies

References

External links
 KCA DEUTAG
 Abbot Group

Service companies of the United Kingdom
Companies based in Aberdeen
Oilfield services companies
Drilling rig operators
Engineering companies of Scotland